John Allen Seybold (June 17, 1923 – February 2, 2005) was an American jewel thief.  Seybold was imprisoned at South Woods State Prison in New Jersey from May 1995 – 2001.

References

External links
 Trivia: "Thief" (Fast Rewind)
 Old Prisoners Speak Out (APBnews.com)
 Crime Library: John Seybold

1923 births
2005 deaths
American prisoners and detainees
Jewel thieves
Prisoners and detainees of New Jersey